Bazgan (also Romanized as Bazgān; also known as Jalālābād) is a village in Zaboli Rural District, in the Central District of Mehrestan County, Sistan and Baluchestan Province, Iran. At the 2006 census, its population was 47, in 9 families.

References 

Populated places in Mehrestan County